Ravne pri Mlinšah is a settlement southeast of Mlinše in the Municipality of Zagorje ob Savi in central Slovenia. The area is part of the traditional region of Upper Carniola. It is now included with the rest of the municipality in the Central Sava Statistical Region.

Name
The name of the settlement was changed from Ravne to Ravne pri Mlinšah in 1955. It is referred to in some sources as Ravne pod Sveto goro.

References

External links

Ravne pri Mlinšah on Geopedia

Populated places in the Municipality of Zagorje ob Savi